Donald Kevin Thorp (born July 10, 1962) is a former professional American football defensive lineman in the National Football League for the New Orleans Saints, the Indianapolis Colts, and the Kansas City Chiefs.  He played college football at the University of Illinois, where he won the Chicago Tribune Silver Football as the Most Valuable Player of the Big Ten Conference in 1983.  He attended Buffalo Grove High School in Buffalo Grove, Illinois.

References

1962 births
Living people
People from Buffalo Grove, Illinois
American football defensive linemen
Illinois Fighting Illini football players
New Orleans Saints players
Indianapolis Colts players
Kansas City Chiefs players
National Football League replacement players